Simone Bastoni (born 5 November 1996) is an Italian professional footballer who plays as a left-back for Serie A club Spezia.

Club career

Spezia

Loan to Robur Siena 
On 20 July 2015, Bastoni was signed by Serie C side Robur Siena. On 6 September he made his Serie C debut for Siena and he scored his first professional goal in the 48th minute of a 1–1 home draw against Carrarese, he played the entire match. On 15 November, Bastoni scored his second goal for Siena in 76th minute of a 2–1 away win over Pisa. On 4 December he scored his third goal for Siena in the 84th minute of a 3–1 home win against L'Aquila. Bastoni ended his loan to Robur Siena with 19 appearances, 3 goals and 1 assist.

Loan to Carrarese 
On 31 August 2016, Bastoni was loaned to Serie C side Carrarese on a season-long loan deal. On 4 September, Bastoni made his debut for Carrarese as a substitute replacing Marco Cristini in the 60th minute of a 3–1 home defeat against Arezzo. On 11 September he played his first entire match for Carrarese, a 1–0 away defeat against Livorno. On 13 November he scored his first goal for Carrarese, as a substitute, in the 80th minute of a 3–1 home win over Como. On 7 December he scored his second goal in the 8th minute of a 2–2 away draw against Pontedera. On 19 February, Bastoni scored his third goal in the 50th minute of a 3–1 away defeat against Tuttocuoio. Bastoni ended his season-long loan to Carrarese with 32 appearances, 4 goals and 3 assists.

Loan to Trapani 
On 1 July 2017, Bastoni was signed by Serie C side Trapani with a season-long loan deal. On 9 September he made his debut for Trapani as a substitute replacing Antonio Palumbo in the 55th minute of a 0–0 home draw against Sicula Leonzio. On 23 October he scored his first goal for Trapani in the 29th minute of a 3–3 home draw against Catanzaro. On 11 November, Bastoni played his first full match for Trapani, a 3–3 away draw against Matera. Bastoni ended his season-long to Trapani with 27 appearances, 1 goal and 2 assists.

Loan to Novara 
On 31 January 2019, Bastoni joined Novara on loan. Three days later, on 3 February he made his debut for Novara in a 0–0 home draw against Piacenza, he played the entire match. Bastoni ended his six-month loan with 16 appearances, including 14 as a starter.

International career 
Bastoni represented Italy at Under-18 and Under-19 level, he collected a total of 5 caps and 1 goal. On 19 March 2014, Bastoni made his U-18 debut in an international friendly against Hungary U-18, he was replaced by Antonio Romano in the 67th minute of a 2–0 home win. On 16 April 2014, he made his debut at U-19 level as a substitute replacing Davide Calabria in the 62nd minute of a 4–2 away win against Switzerland U-19. On 5 September 2014, Bastoni scored his first goal at U-19 level in the 89th minute of a 5–0 away win against Slovakia U-19 in an international friendly.

Personal life 
On 5 January 2021, Bastoni tested positive for COVID-19.

Career statistics

Club

References

External links
 

Living people
1996 births
People from La Spezia
Italian footballers
Association football midfielders
Italy youth international footballers
Spezia Calcio players
A.C.N. Siena 1904 players
Carrarese Calcio players
Trapani Calcio players
Novara F.C. players
Serie A players
Serie B players
Serie C players
Footballers from Liguria
Sportspeople from the Province of La Spezia